Thai Son Nam Futsal Club (Vietnamese: Câu lạc bộ futsal Thái Sơn Nam) is a Vietnam futsal club. The team is current champion of Vietnam National Futsal League and is the most successful futsal club in Vietnam.

Thai Son Nam FC is also the one of the strongest teams in Asia, having reaching AFC Futsal Club Championship final in 2018, and three bronze medals in 2015, 2017 and 2019.

Honours

League

Vietnam National Futsal League
 Winners (10): 2009,2010, 2012,2013, 2014, 2016, 2017, 2018, 2019, 2020
 Runners-up (3): 2011, 2012,2022
 Third place (1): 2015

Cup

Vietnamese National Futsal Cup 
 Champions (4): 2016, 2017, 2018, 2020
Ho Chi Minh City Futsal Cup
 Champions (4): 2015, 2017, 2018, 2019
 Runners-up (1): 2014
 Third place (1): 2016

International

AFC Futsal Club Championship
 Runner-up (1): 2018
 Third place (3): 2015, 2017, 2019
AFF Futsal Club Championship
 Runner-up (1): 2016

AFC Championship appearances
   2012 — Group stage
  2013 — Group stage  
  2015 —  Third place
  2017 —  Third place
  2018 —  Runner-up
  2019 —  Third place

Kit suppliers and shirt sponsors

International results

Leadership and Coaches

Current squad

References

External links
  Thai Son Nam Futsal Club

Futsal clubs in Vietnam
Futsal clubs established in 2001
2001 establishments in Vietnam